Eye on Crime is the title of a Hardy Boys Digest novel, written by Franklin W. Dixon.  It is the 153rd volume in the Hardy Boys series of detective/adventure books.

Frank and Joe solve the mystery of some local jewelry store robberies.

The Hardy Boys books
1998 American novels
1998 children's books